Pullu  is a village in Thrissur district in the state of Kerala, India. It is a part of Chazhoor Grama Panchayath. Coal wetlands and paddy fields form the geographical landscape around the village. It is also the birthplace of the Malayalam film actress Manju Warrier.

References

Villages in Thrissur district